Peter Damien Quinlan   is the Chief Justice of Western Australia. His appointment was announced on 1 August 2018, and took effect on 13 August. He was the Solicitor-General of Western Australia from 2016 to 2018.

Quinlan attended John XXIII College before studied commerce and law at the University of Western Australia; he won the HCF Keall Prize for best final year student. He worked in the Crown Solicitor's Office from 1993 to 1995 as an assistant to the Solicitor General, then again from 1996 working in constitutional and administrative law.

In 2001 Quinlan commenced practising as a barrister. He was appointed Senior Counsel in 2010, and was president of the WA Bar Association from 2012 to 2015. He was appointed as Solicitor-General of Western Australia on 1 July 2016. He has also served as director of the Law Council of Australia, and on the board of governors for the University of Notre Dame.

Personal life
Quinlan is married with five children.

He is the great great grandson of a convict transportee, Daniel Connor.

References

External links
 The Hon Chief Justice Peter Damien Quinlan, Supreme Court of Western Australia website

Living people
Australian Senior Counsel
Chief Justices of Western Australia
Solicitors-General of Western Australia
1970 births
University of Western Australia alumni
Judges of the Supreme Court of Western Australia
21st-century Australian judges